Konibodom is a city in the Sughd Region of northern Tajikistan, in western Fergana Valley. It has a population of 54,400 (2022 est.).

Geography

Climate
Konibodom has a hot, dry-summer continental climate (Köppen climate classification Dsa). The average annual temperature is 14 °C (57.2 °F). The warmest month is July with an average temperature of 27.4 °C (81.3 °F) and the coolest month is January with an average temperature of −0.6 °C (30.9 °F). The average annual precipitation is 465.5mm (18.3") and has an average of 68.9 days with precipitation. The wettest month is March with an average of 77.7mm (3.1") of precipitation and the driest month is August with an average of 1.9mm (0.08") of precipitation.

Subdivisions
Before ca. 2018, Konibodom was the seat of Konibodom District, which covered the rural part of the present city of Konibodom. The city of Konibodom covers Konibodom proper and six jamoats. These are as follows:

Notable people
Sa'diniso Hakimova, obstetrician and gynecologist 
Lutfi Zohidova, ballet dancer
Namat Karabaev, the first Hero of the Soviet Union from a Soviet republic.
Mukarrama Qosimova

See also
 List of cities in Tajikistan

References

Populated places in Sughd Region